Operation Red Dog was the code name of an April 27, 1981 military filibustering plot by Canadian and American citizens, largely affiliated with white supremacist and Ku Klux Klan groups, to overthrow the government of Dominica, where they planned to restore former Prime Minister Patrick John to power. The chief figures included American Klansman Mike Perdue, German-Canadian neo-Nazi Wolfgang Droege, American white supremacist Don Black and Barbadian weapons smuggler Sydney Burnett-Alleyne. After the plot was thwarted by US federal agents in New Orleans, Louisiana, the news media dubbed it "Bayou of Pigs", after the failed 1961 Bay of Pigs invasion.

The leader Mike Perdue and six other men pleaded guilty to violation of the Neutrality Act; two others were found guilty by a jury.
The men received three-year prison sentences. Among those Perdue implicated were former Texas Governor John Connally, prominent white supremacist David Duke, and Congressman Ron Paul, who he claimed knew about the plot.

Mission

On April 27, 1981, Droege and eight other men, including Canadian James Alexander McQuirter and American Don Black, who later founded the white nationalist website Stormfront, were arrested by  federal agents in New Orleans as they prepared to board a boat with automatic weapons, shotguns, rifles, handguns, dynamite, ammunition, and a black and white Nazi flag.

The plan was to charter a boat to Dominica and rendezvous via rubber boats with Patrick John and his makeshift army. The genesis of the idea came from long-time Klan member Perdue, who was introduced in 1979 to Droege. That summer, Perdue outlined his plan to overthrow the government of Grenada and set up several lucrative businesses. After their meeting, it was established that Droege would locate funds and resources. Croatian-Canadian Don Andrews was initially involved, but after Perdue changed the target island to Dominica, Andrews withdrew. Klansmen Arnie Polli and Roger Dermee were paid US$3,000 to visit Dominica and make a preliminary reconnaissance. German-Canadian neo-Nazi Martin K. Weiche was allegedly a financial backer of the plot along with James White of Houston and L. E. Matthews of Jackson, Mississippi.

In February 1981, the captain and crew backed out. Perdue then approached a local boat captain and Vietnam War veteran, Michael S. Howell. Perdue said that the Central Intelligence Agency needed his boat for a covert operation. Howell then contacted the US Bureau of Alcohol, Tobacco and Firearms (ATF). On April 25, John was arrested in Dominica. When Perdue learned of the arrest and that their plans were no longer secret, he insisted that the mission should continue. On April 27, the group, including three ATF agents, met at the predetermined location, loaded the van and proceeded to the marina. Local police were waiting for them at the marina.

In 1984, during an interview by Barbados's daily Nation Newspaper, Sydney Burnett-Alleyne, one of the leaders of the plot, was asked if the group had planned to overthrow the government of Barbados and install John as prime minister there as well. He responded:

A book about the plot, Bayou of Pigs, by Canadian journalist Stewart Bell, was published in August 2008.

See also

Abaco Independence Movement
Frederick Newton
Knights of the Golden Circle
Republic of Minerva
Ku Klux Klan in Canada
The Nine Nations of North America

References

Further reading
 
 
 
 
 
Cups Up: How I Organized a Klavern, Plotted a Coup, Survived Prison, Graduated College, Fought Polluters, and Started a Business (Willie Morris Books in Memoir and Biography): Malvaney, George T.: 9781496816795: Amazon.com: Books.

External links
Related photos and documents of Michael S. Howell
Canadian neo-nazis were central to the planned invasion of Dominica in 1981
Photos and documents on Stewart Bell's Website

Coup d'état attempts in North America
Red Dog
Conflicts in 1981
Dominica–United States relations
1981 in Barbados
1981 in Dominica
1980s in Grenada
Ku Klux Klan
Canada–Dominica relations